Terrain is a 1994 Australian film directed by Terry Kyle and starring Jonathan Hardy, Amande Mires, and Gerowyn Lacaze. It is set on a remote planet about the crew of the research station Orpheus.

References

External links

Terrain at Screen Australia

Australian television films
1994 television films
1994 films
1990s science fiction films
Australian science fiction films
1990s English-language films